Seni may refer to:

 Seni Pramoj (1905—1997)
 Seni Awa Camara (b. c. 1945), a Senegalese sculptor
 Ole Seni, a settlement in Kenya's Rift Valley Province
 Gumbat, also known as Seni Gumbat, a town in Khyber Pakhtunkhwa, Pakistan
 The Central Market (Malay: Pasar Seni) in Kuala Lumpur
 The Pasar Seni LRT station, in Kuala Lumpur
 Prasasti Seni, an album by Malaysian pop singer Siti Nurhaliza
 Seni rebab, a plucked string instrument most associated with Sikh music
 Seni Gayung Fatani, a Malaysian style of silat

SENI, as an acronym, may refer to:

 Scincidae Ecological Niche Index
 Special Education Needs and Inclusion

Seni is also a word in Indonesian, which may refer to:

 Institut Seni Indonesia (Indonesian: Institute of the Arts of Indonesia):
 Sekolah Tinggi Seni Indonesia (disambiguation) (Indonesian: Advanced school for the arts of Indonesia)